CNCI usually refers to either:
 The Chittaranjan National Cancer Institute
 The Comprehensive National Cybersecurity Initiative